Las Vertientes – Reserva Natural Privada, located within the Los Lagos Region of Chile, was formed in 2009 with the aim of promoting wildlife conservation and environmental education for the children of the Northern Patagonia. In addition to naturally occurring animal species such as birds and a variety of wildlife, flora, fauna. The philosophy behind Las Vertientes Nature Reserve is creating a place where endangered species can once again thrive has also created a rare experience for the small number of people who are allowed to visit.

References

Protected areas of Los Lagos Region